Shaft may refer to:

Rotating machine elements
 Shaft (mechanical engineering), a rotating machine element used to transmit power
 Line shaft, a power transmission system
 Drive shaft, a shaft for transferring torque
 Axle, a shaft around which one or more wheels rotate

Vertical narrow passages 
 Elevator shaft, a vertical passage housing a lift or elevator
 Ventilation shaft, a vertical passage used in mines and tunnels to move fresh air underground, and to remove stale air
 Shaft (civil engineering), an underground vertical or inclined passageway
 Pitch (ascent/descent), a significant underground vertical space in caving terminology
 Shaft mining, the method of excavating a vertical or near-vertical tunnel from the top down, where there is initially no access to the bottom
 Shafting, illicit travelling through shafts

Long narrow rigid bodies 
 The body of a column between the capital and the pedestal, or the column itself
 Type of long handle (grip) of hand-tools
 Shaft (golf), the long, tapered tube or rod which connects the golfer’s hands to the club head
 Staff, various applications

Fiction 
 Shaft (franchise), a media franchise involving novels, comics, TV, film
 Shaft (novel), 1970 novel by Ernest Tidyman about an African-American private detective
 Shaft (1971 film), a film based on the novel
 Shaft (song), theme song from the original film, serving as the theme for the entire franchise
 Shaft (2000 film), a direct sequel/spin-off of the 1971 film, released in 2000, and fourth film in the series
 Shaft (2000 soundtrack)
 Shaft (2019 film), a direct sequel to the 2000 film and fifth film in the series
 Shaft (TV series), a 1973-1974 series of TV movies
 Shaft (Dynamite Entertainment), a comic book series based on the character John Shaft
 John Shaft, the titular character of the franchise
 Shaft (Castlevania), the dark priest from the Castlevania video game series
 Shaft (Marvel Comics), a Marvel Comics ninja character
 Shaft (Image Comics), a comic book character created by Rob Liefeld for his comic Youngblood
 Down (film), a 2001 horror film also known as The Shaft

Music 
 Shaft (rave group), a UK dance music act which had a 1991 hit with "Roobarb and Custard" sampling vintage children's television programme Roobarb
 Shaft (British electronic duo), a dance music act which had a 1999 hit with a cover-remix of "(Mucho Mambo) Sway"
 Shaft (New Zealand band), a New Zealand indie band
 Shaft (club), a blues and jazz club in Istanbul, Turkey
 Shaft (Isaac Hayes album), the soundtrack for the film of the same name, recorded by Isaac Hayes
 "Theme from Shaft", performed by Isaac Hayes
 Shaft (Bernard Purdie album), a 1971 jazz album featuring a cover of the above track

Places 
 Borden Shaft, Maryland, formerly called Shaft
 Shaft County, an administrative division of Gīlan Province in Iran
 Shaft, Iran, the capital of Shaft County
 Shaft, Bushehr, a village and island in Bushehr Province, Iran

Other 
 Shaft (company), a Japanese animation studio
 Penis shaft, a part of the penis
 Diaphysis, shaft of a long bone